Hargla is a village in Valga Parish, Valga County in southern Estonia. As of 2011 Census, the settlement's population was 169.

Gallery

References

Villages in Valga County
Valga Parish
Kreis Werro